Ricardo Jorge Oliveira Ribeiro Duarte (born 11 February 1982 in Pontinha (Odivelas)), known as Santamaria, is a Portuguese former footballer who played as a central defender.

Honours
Sporting CP
Taça de Portugal: 2001–02

References

External links

1982 births
Living people
Portuguese footballers
Association football defenders
Primeira Liga players
Liga Portugal 2 players
Segunda Divisão players
Sporting CP footballers
Sporting CP B players
F.C. Marco players
C.F. Estrela da Amadora players
S.C. Olhanense players
C.D. Pinhalnovense players
Segunda División B players
SD Ponferradina players
Cypriot First Division players
AEP Paphos FC players
Alki Larnaca FC players
Portugal youth international footballers
Portugal under-21 international footballers
Portuguese expatriate footballers
Expatriate footballers in Spain
Expatriate footballers in Cyprus
Portuguese expatriate sportspeople in Spain
Portuguese expatriate sportspeople in Cyprus